Line 10 may refer to:

China
 Line 10 (Beijing Subway), a subway line in Beijing
 Line 10 (Chengdu Metro), a metro line in Chengdu, Sichuan
 Line 10 (Chongqing Rail Transit), a metro line in Chongqing
 Line 10 (Guangzhou Metro), a metro line under construction in Guangzhou, Guangdong
 Line 10 (Hangzhou Metro), a metro line in Hangzhou, Zhejiang
 Line 10 (Nanjing Metro), a metro line in Nanjing, Jiangsu
 Line 10 (Shanghai Metro), a metro line in Shanghai
 Line 10 (Shenyang Metro), a metro line in Shenyang, Liaoning
 Line 10 (Shenzhen Metro), a metro line in Shenzhen, Guangdong
 Line 10 (Tianjin Metro), a metro line in Tianjin

Europe
 Barcelona Metro line 10, a metro line in Spain
 Rodalies Barcelona line 10, a former commuter railway in Spain
 Line 10 (BLT), a tramway in Basel, Switzerland
 CFL Line 10, a railway line in Luxembourg
 Line 10 (Madrid Metro), a line in Spain
 Line 10 (Moscow Metro), the Lyublinsko-Dmitrovskaya line in Russia
 Line 10 (Naples Metro), a rapid transit railway line in the Metropolitana di Napoli, Italy
 Paris Métro Line 10, a metro line in France
 Line 10 (Stockholm metro), a blue line in Sweden
 Line 10 (Metrovalencia), a partially completed future tram and metro line in Valencia, Spain

Elsewhere
 Line 10 (CPTM), a line of the Companhia Paulista de Trens Metropolitanos commuter rail system in São Paulo, Brazil
 Line 10 (Mumbai Metro), an elevated line in India
 Skypark Link or line 10, a limited express train service in Kuala Lumpur, Malaysia
 10 (Los Angeles Railway), a former streetcar line in Los Angeles, California